Bryan Jones (born October 31, 1973), better known by his stage name The R.O.C. (Raps On Contact), is an American rapper from Detroit, Michigan. He is a founding member of the group House of Krazees, which was originally active from 1992 until 1997, when Hektic (Monoxide) and Mr. Bones (Jamie Madrox) left to form Twiztid, who were subsequently signed to Psychopathic Records.

After performing as the hype man for Blaze Ya Dead Homie, R.O.C. signed to Hatchet House in 2008. After briefly retiring beginning in 2009, The R.O.C. came out of retirement.

The R.O.C. also has a younger brother names Mr. Y.U.G. (Formerly known as RAGZ), who is a known Detroit artist, and has also been featured on many of his tracks, as well as Cousin Evol of Detroit. He also has other younger brothers that made music, but were not as involved. Rann, Killjoy (who is in lockdown), and Chosen Blessed who was killed in a shooting. The R.O.C. is also cousin of Bamm & Esham (The Boogieman a.k.a. The Unholy) through marriage.

Career 
The R.O.C.'s first album was released with his cousin Big Father Hightop (Evol of Detroit) & produced by Esham under Strength Productions, titled "Rollin' With Strength". In late 1992, The R.O.C. teamed up with fellow Detroit emcees Paul Methric and Jamie Spaniolo, and the trio then formed House of Krazees. The R.O.C. was first originally the producer of the group and was asked to perform on a couple tracks and it was then decided by Jamie (who went by the name of Mr. Bones) and Paul (who went by the name of Hektic) that he would be the third member. House of Krazees' catalog was only released on cassette until the group signed to Latnem Intertainment. Problems between House of Krazees and Latnem led the group to leave the label following its 1996 album, Head Trauma.  House of Krazees officially disbanded in 1997, due to conflicts with their manager, Walter Stepanenko (Latnem Int. CEO). The R.O.C changed his rap name to SOL46. Madrox and Monoxide left to join Psychopathic Records in late 1997 as Twiztid. In early 1999, Skrapz joined The R.O.C. to help finish HOK's last album 'The Night They Kame Home', and the House of Krazees name was then retired. After the last House of Krazees album, The R.O.C. formed a group with local Detroit acts known as "The Howse" and  released one album, titled Esohpromatem which is Metamorphose backwards.  It consisted of three official members and a fourth as a feature. They were The R.O.C. (which he went by for the album), Armageddon, The Beast, and Black Widow (Miz Korona) as the feature. Mr. Vitology of Vitology Music Group produced the album and Beast later joined Detroits IT5 Tribe a.k.a. The Indigenous Tribe as Morpheus. The album was also released under HOK's label Latnem Int. After the Howse disbanded and The R.O.C. ended his relationship with Latnem Int., The R.O.C. a.k.a. SOL released another solo album and his only under his second stage name, titled Wormholes. After HOK and The Howse disbanded, SOL and Skrapz formed Halfbreed on their own record label, Virus Independent with label mates Mr. F.Reeze (later Dial81) and  brother Mr. Y.U.G. and his group 2winn Gunnz with friend 1-I-Bandit, for five albums until its eventual disbandment in 2003 due to the members wanting to pursue different styles and sounds, ultimately leading to mutual musical differences.

The R.O.C. later became the hype man for Psychopathic Records artist Blaze Ya Dead Homie. He appears on Blaze's 2007 album Clockwork Gray, on the tracks "Ill Connect", "Inside Looking Out" and "E.O.D." The R.O.C. signed to Hatchet House in 2008 and released an EP, Welcome To The Darkside. In Blaze Ya Dead Homie's pamphlet in Clockwork Gray there was a promotion for a new group formed called Zodiac MPrint composed of The R.O.C.' and Blaze Ya Dead Homie and their new album titled Horrorscope to be released in 2008. Nothing came of the album and The R.O.C. left in 2009. Also on Clockwork Gray, there was a song by a group called Samhein Witch Killaz composed of Zodiac MPrint and Twiztid. They were set to release their debut album titled Bloodletting but after The R.O.C. left Hatchet House the group disbanded. In 2011 on Twiztid's official Twitter account they were asked if Samhein Witch Killaz would ever reform and release another song or their debut album, and the response was "No". Now that Twiztid, Blaze Ya Dead Homie and The R.O.C. are no longer on Psychopathic Records, Samhein Witch Killaz could possibly reform and release their debut album on Twiztid's new record label.

In 2009, R.O.C. announced that he was retiring from music. In 2012, he came out of retirement and appeared on Prozak's EP Nocturnal, contributing a verse on "Knuckle Up". R.O.C. also appeared on Psychopathic's fourth "Psypher", released in October 2012. R.O.C. and Skrapz in 2012 have announced that HalfBreed has reunited as well as Level Jumpers with Dial81, there are no details of their next release, only a few released tracks. R.O.C. has said that he will release a solo album titled, Digital Voodoo. R.O.C., Mr. Bones and Hektic revived House of Krazees in early 2013 and were featured on Twiztid's A New Nightmare EP. Also House of Krazees released a greatest hits compilation titled Casket Cutz on October 23, 2013. Since The R.O.C. has returned to music he has been tweeting about bumping rough cuts of new Zodiac MPrint songs on his official Twitter account. Shortly after Zodiac MPrint created their own official Twitter account. They have been dropping hints about their new album, but not saying very much. The name Skywalkers has been talked about a lot. Also Zodiac MPrint was featured on 2 songs (Beware of the Wolf) and (Gettin Wu Wit It) off of Twiztid's 4 Tha Fam Vol. 2 mixxtape which was released on March 27, 2014. The R.O.C. makes his first appearance on a Blaze Ya Dead Homie album for the first time in seven years, it is his first appearance on a Blaze album since Clockwork Gray. It was announced in mid-October 2014 through his various social media accounts that The R.O.C. will release a new single titled "Don't Look Behind You" during Twiztid's Fright Fest Tour 2014, but only for October 30, October 31 and November 1 dates.

On May 4, 2015 it was announced that The R.O.C. will be rereleasing X-Posed and Oh Hell No! digitally. During Twiztid and Blaze Ya Dead Homie's 2015 GOTJ seminar it was announced that The R.O.C.'s debut album on the label will be out in early 2016. On July 10, 2016 it was announced that The R.O.C. will release a new EP at the GOTJ 2016. No title has been given but speculation has it that it will be titled "The Fucking Preylewd".

On January 1, 2017 The R.O.C. was invited to participate in the Juggalo March On Washington. On January 3, 2017 he declined the invitation.

Discography

Solo career
 Rollin' With Strength EP (1992) (Strength Productions)
 X-Posed (1996) (Latnem Records)
 Wormholes EP (2001) [As SoL46] (Virus Independent)
 Bits & Pieces (2004) (Independent)
 I'm Here EP (2005) (Independent)
 Oh Hell No! (2006) (Independent)
 Welcome To The Darkside EP (2008) (Hatchet House)
 The Fucking Preylewd EP (GOTJ 2016) (Majik Ninja Entertainment)
 Digital Voodoo (April 14, 2017) (Majik Ninja Entertainment)
 Monsters Ain’t Real (November 15, 2019)(Majik Ninja Entertainment)

Zodiac MPrint
 Ride The Stars EP (May 20, 2016) (Majik Ninja Entertainment)

House of Krazees
 Home Sweet Home (1993)
 Home Bound (1994)
 Season Of The Pumpkin (1994)
 Outbreed (1995)
 Head Trauma (1996)
 Collectors Edition 97 (1997)
 The Night They Kame Home (1999)
 Remix & Rewind
 Casket Cutz  (2013)

Samhein Witch Killaz
 Bloodletting (Unreleased)

HalfBreed
 Serial Killaz
 Killaz Of The World (Unreleased)
 KontamiNATION
 Rage of The Plague
 The End

The Howse
 Esohpromatem

Level Jumpers
 Simply Complex
 Red Pyramids

Guest appearances

Music Videos

Group Music Videos

Awards and nominations 

!
|-
|align=center|2018
|Digital Voodoo
|Detroit Music Award for Outstanding Rap Recording
|
|rowspan="2"| 
|-
|align=center|2019
|Himself
|Detroit Music Award for Outstanding Rap Artist
|
|-

References

1973 births
Living people
Horrorcore artists
Underground rappers
Rappers from Detroit
Hatchet House artists
Majik Ninja Entertainment artists
African-American rappers
21st-century American rappers
21st-century African-American musicians
20th-century African-American people